The People's Republic of Albania executed 22 intellectuals without trial on 26 February 1951, as ordered by Enver Hoxha. They were accused of bombing the Soviet embassy in Tirana. The victims were 21 males and one female. One day earlier, Jonuz Kaceli was killed while accused of the same crime. It was the first time the Agitation and Propaganda law was used.

Background

Arrests
The 22 individuals were arrested and put in prison between 20 and 22 February 1951, then executed by firing squad on 26 February. The pretext was the explosion of a small amount of dynamite in the Soviet Embassy in Tirana on 19 February, for which the arrested persons were accused of. On 20 February, the Communist leadership assembled and decided on counter-measures. Present were Enver Hoxha, Tuk Jakova, Mehmet Shehu, Bedri Spahiu, Hysni Kapo, Gogo Nushi, Spiro Koleka, Beqir Balluku and Liri Belishova.

The arrests were made based on death lists prepared in advance by the Ministry of Interior. The charge, as prepared and signed by Military Prosecutor Siri Çarçani and dated 25 February 1951, was the same for all 22 victims and read:

The same Çarçani admitted later that when he wrote the charge he was completely unaware of any investigation having ever been performed. In addition, the charge was never communicated to any of the victims. Furthermore, a trial was never held.

Execution

One of the arrested intellectuals, Jonuz Kaceli, was killed a day earlier (25 February), by Mehmet Shehu after Kaceli punched and injured Shehu in the face after a long interrogation on high treason accusations by Shehu and Rasim Dedja. Kaceli was thrown out of a window, head-first from the second floor, in the pretense that he had committed suicide.

The 22 victims were executed on 26 February 1951, six days after the first arrest was made. All of the victims were shot based on a government decree issued by the Ministry of the Interior on the same day of the killings. The Minister of Interior that issued the decree was Omer Nishani. Manol Konomi, at the time minister of justice, did not want to sign the death sentences without approval. They were executed at midnight, near the Beshiri bridge, 15 km from Tirana, and were buried in a common grave, bound together.

On 26 February 1951 the other victims were shot by an execution squad. The head of the police during that time, Sali Ormëni, was killed one week after the bombing. On 5 March 1951 the executions were approved by the military court of Communist Albania; that is eight days after the suspects were executed.

Aftermath and legacy
It was later found out that the bombing was actually orchestrated by Hysen Llulla and Qazim Laçi.

In 1991 all victims were declared innocent, and posthumously awarded the order Honor of the State by president Bamir Topi. Their bodies were found bound with barbed wire in a joint mass grave on the Erzen river edge.

Victims

Ali Qoraliu, politician
Anton Delhysa, builder
Gjon Temali, pharmaceut
Fadil Dizdari, librarian
Gafurr Jegeni, officer
Haki Kodra, businessman
Hekuran Troka, businessman
Jonuz Kaceli, businessman
Luka Rašković, Yugoslav businessman
Manush Peshkëpia, poet
Mehmet Ali Shkupi, thermal engineer
Myftar Jegeni, officer
Niko Lezo, chemist
Pandeli Nova, businessman
Petro Konomi, telegraphist
Pjerrin Guraziu, economist
Qemal Kasaruho, economist
Reiz Selfo, businessman
Sabiha Kasimati, biologist
Tefik Shehu, economist and jurist
Thoma Katundi, engineer
Zyhdi Herri, journalist

See also
List of massacres in Albania

External links
Short documentary about the massacre English
Special about Massacre of 1951 in Albania 
Special on TV Klan

Further reading

Gazeta 55, p. 16-17

References

1951 in Albania
Mass murder in 1951
People's Socialist Republic of Albania
Political and cultural purges
Massacres in Albania by communist regime
Enver Hoxha
Albania–Soviet Union relations
Cold War history of Albania
Anti-intellectualism
February 1951 events in Europe